The Tar is a river in County Tipperary, Ireland. It joins the Suir between the towns of Ardfinnan and Newcastle. The Tar's tributaries include the River Duag which joins it shortly after they both flow through Clogheen.

The Tar was an important source of power to drive grain processing mills up to the 19th century.

References 

Rivers of County Tipperary